Flyweight is a weight class in combat sports.

Boxing
Flyweight is a class in boxing which includes fighters weighing above 49 kg (108 lb) and up to 51 kg (112 lb).

Professional boxing
The flyweight division was the last of boxing's eight traditional weight classes to be established. Before 1909, anyone below featherweight was considered a bantamweight, regardless of how small the boxer. In 1911, the organization that eventually became the British Boxing Board of Control held a match that crowned Sid Smith as the first flyweight champion of the world. Jimmy Wilde, who reigned from 1916 to 1923, was the first fighter recognized both in Britain and the United States as a flyweight champion.

Other notable flyweights include Victor Perez, Pancho Villa, Walter McGowan, Pascual Pérez, Pone Kingpetch, Fighting Harada, Masao Ohba, Chartchai Chionoi, Efren Torres, Erbito Salavarria, Miguel Canto, Dave McAuley, Charlie Magri, Gabriel Bernal, Santos Laciar, Sot Chitalada, Yong-Kang Kim, Yuri Arbachakov, Danny Romero, Mark "Too Sharp" Johnson, Manny Pacquiao, Jorge Arce, Vic Darchinyan, Nonito Donaire, Pongsaklek Wonjongkam, Amnat Ruenroeng, Román González, McWilliams Arroyo, Donnie Nietes, Nicola Adams.

Current world champions

Current The Ring world rankings

As of November 12, 2022.

Keys:
 Current The Ring world champion

Longest reigning world flyweight champions
Below is a list of longest reigning flyweight champions in boxing measured by the individual's longest reign. Career total time as champion (for multiple time champions) does not apply.

Amateur boxing

Olympic Champions

Men’s

1904: 
1920: 
1924: 
1928: 
1932: 
1936: 
1948: 
1952: 
1956: 
1960: 
1964: 
1968: 
1972: 
1976: 
1980: 
1984: 
1988: 
1992: 
1996: 
2000: 
2004: 
2008: 
2012: 
2016: 
2020:

Women’s

2012: 
2016: 
2020:

Pan American Champions

Men’s

1951:  Alberto Barenghi (ARG)
1955:  Hilario Correa (MEX)
1959:  Miguel Angel Botta (ARG)
1963:  Floreal García (URU)
1967:  Francisco Rodríguez (VEN)
1971:  Francisco Rodríguez (VEN)
1975:  Ramón Duvalón (CUB)
1979:  Alberto Mercado (PUR)
1983:  Pedro Orlando Reyes (CUB)
1987:  Adalberto Regalado (CUB)
1991:  José Ramos (CUB)
1995:  Joan Guzmán (DOM)
1999:  Omar Andrés Narváez (ARG)
2003:  Yuriorkis Gamboa (CUB)
2007:  McWilliams Arroyo (PUR)
2011:  Robeisy Ramírez (CUB)
2015:  Antonio Vargas (USA)
2019:  Rodrigo Marte (DOM)

Kickboxing
In kickboxing, a flyweight fighter generally weighs 53 kg (116 lb) or under. The International Kickboxing Federation (IKF) Flyweight division (professional and amateur) is 112.1 lb. – 117 lb. or 50.95 kg – 53.18 kg.

Bare-knuckle boxing
The limit for flyweight generally differs among promotions in bare knuckle boxing: 

Mixed Martial Arts
The flyweight division in mixed martial arts – as defined by the Nevada State Athletic Commission combat sports doctrine and by the Association of Boxing Commissions – groups together all competitors 125 lb (57 kg) and below. It sits between Strawweight (106 lb-115 lb) and Bantamweight (126 lb-135lb).

The flyweight division in mixed martial arts refers to a number of different weight classes:

The UFC's flyweight division, which groups competitors within 116 to 125 lb (53 to 57 kg)
The Pancrase light flyweight division with an upper limit of 120 lb
The Shooto flyweight division with an upper limit of 115 lb
The ONE Championship's flyweight division, with upper limit at 
The Road FC's flyweight division, with upper limit at 125 lb (57 kg)

Professional champions
These tables are not always up to date. Last updated on March 5, 2023. 

Men:

Women:

See also
List of current MMA Flyweight Champions
List of Road FC Flyweight Champions
List of current MMA Women's Flyweight Champions

References

External links

Mixed martial arts weight classes

Boxing weight classes
Kickboxing weight classes
Taekwondo weight classes
Wrestling weight classes